George Fest – subtitled A Night to Celebrate the Music of George Harrison – is a live album and concert DVD package documenting the George Fest tribute concert to former Beatle George Harrison, held at the Fonda Theatre in Los Angeles on 28 September 2014. The album and documentary were released on 26 February 2016.

The 2014 concert coincided with the reissue of Harrison's Apple Records solo albums. Among the many performers were Brian Wilson and Al Jardine of the Beach Boys, Dhani Harrison, Norah Jones, Wayne Coyne and Steven Drozd of the Flaming Lips, Conan O'Brien, Spoon's Britt Daniel, and Brandon Flowers of the Killers. Other performers included Ben Harper, "Weird Al" Yankovic, Ann Wilson of Heart, and Ian Astbury.

Track listing
All songs by George Harrison unless otherwise noted.

Disc one

Disc two

Charts

References

2016 live albums
George Harrison tribute albums
BMG Rights Management albums
Various artists albums